Sofie Linde Ingversen (born Sofie Linde Lauridsen, 22 September 1989 in Aarhus), professionally known as Sofie Linde, is a Danish television presenter and main presenter of the Danish X-Factor.

Private life 
Sofie Linde was born in Aarhus but spent most of her early life in Odder. She made her acting debut in the 2009 Danish film Aching Hearts (Kærestesorger).

In January 2016, she debuted as the main presenter of the ninth series of the Danish version of X-Factor.

On 13 August 2017, it was announced she and television presenter Joakim Ingversen were expecting their first child. and they married on 27 December 2017.

Statements on sexual harassment 

In September 2020, Politiken published a letter signed by more than 700 Danish women, addressed to Linde. The letter said "you are right, we experienced it too". It was referring to Linde's critique at the sexual harassment and sexist workplace culture Linde had experienced. Linde's comments unleashed a wave of debate, involving the resignation of Danish Social Liberal Party leader Morten Østergaard. Copenhagen mayor Frank Jensen also admitted that he had been harassing women during his career.

External links

References

1989 births
Living people
Danish television personalities
Danish women journalists
Danish television presenters
Danish film actresses
Danish women television presenters
People from Aarhus
People from Odder Municipality